BAFF receptor (B-cell activating factor receptor, BAFF-R), also known as tumor necrosis factor receptor superfamily member 13C (TNFRSF13C) and BLyS receptor 3 (BR3), is a membrane protein of the TNF receptor superfamily which recognizes BAFF, an essential factor for B cell maturation and survival. In humans it is encoded by the TNFRSF13C gene.

Function 

B-cell activating factor (BAFF) enhances B-cell survival in vitro and is a regulator of the peripheral B-cell population. The protein encoded by this gene is a receptor for BAFF and is a type III transmembrane protein containing a single extracellular phenylalanine-rich domain. It is thought that this receptor is the principal receptor required for BAFF-mediated mature B-cell survival. In B cell maturation, due to regulation by BAFF-R, only a limited amount of B-cell will survive.

Clinical significance 

Overexpression of BAFF in mice results in mature B-cell hyperplasia and symptoms of systemic lupus erythematosus (SLE). Also, some SLE patients have increased levels of BAFF in serum. Therefore, it has been proposed that abnormally high levels of BAFF may contribute to the pathogenesis of autoimmune diseases by enhancing the survival of autoreactive B cells, which are cells that show immune response to normal body cells. Autoreactive B cells are less sensitive toward BAFF and are usually outcompeted by the normal B cells in the maturation process regulated by low BAFF-R expression. An elevated level of BAFF-R can therefore overcome this decreased response and result in accumulation of autoreactive B cells.

BAFF and BAFF-R pair can also down-regulate the cell apoptosis process.

See also 
B-cell activating factor
B-cell maturation antigen

References

External links

Further reading 

 
 
 
 
 
 
 
 
 
 
 
 
 
 
 

Clusters of differentiation
TNF receptor family